Jane Christina Flemming OAM (born 14 April 1965) is a former Australian Olympic track and field athlete. She completed her HSC in 1982 at Mater Christi College, Belgrave. She was the 1990 Commonwealth Games champion at heptathlon and long jump and also represented Australia internationally at 100 m hurdles.

Athletics career
Flemming started her athletics career competing for the Fairpark Little Athletics Club at the Knox Little Athletics Centre.

In Australian National Championships, she won thirteen open titles at heptathlon (5), 100 m hurdles (5), 100 m (2) and 100 y (1) events. She was named the Australian female athlete of the year in 1993.

A two-time Olympian, she also competed at the 1986, 1990 and 1994 Commonwealth Games. Her highest score in the heptathlon - 6695 points - set winning the 1990 Commonwealth gold medal still stands as the Australian and Commonwealth Games record at February 2016.

Flemming's individual performances during this competition were:

 100 m hurdles - 13.21 (+1.4 m/s)
 high jump - 1.82 m
 shot put - 13.76 m
 200 m - 23.62 (+2.4 m/s)
 long jump - 6.57 m (+1.6 m/s)
 javelin throw - 49.28 m
 800 m - 2:12.53

In Auckland, Flemming also won the long jump gold medal, with a career best of 6.78 m.

Her best performance at the Olympic Games was 7th in Seoul 1988. Flemming also placed 7th at the 1993 World Athletics Championships.

At the Ulster Games in Belfast on 30 June 1986 Flemming, on request of Australian team manager Maurie Plant, infamously provided a urine sample to allow another athlete, Sue Howland, to use Flemming's urine pass a drug test.  The Australian Senate report into drugs in sport (known as the "Black" report after Senator John Black) later gave Jane Flemming an official warning, and also banned Maurie Plant from managing any athletes in the future.

Post-athletics career
After retiring from international competition, Flemming has worked as an athletics commentator in Australia for the Seven Network and SBS Television. She has also represented British Olympic legends Sebastian Coe & Daley Thompson, USA legend Michael Johnson and other athletes as a business manager, working in both Australia and Great Britain.

In 2006, Flemming was a commentator on Nine Network's coverage of the 2006 Commonwealth Games, and also appeared on a celebrity special of Temptation.

Awarded the Order of Australia on 26 January 2014 for services to athletics and to the community.

in 2013, Flemming helped Live Life Get Active, a private social initiative that offers free health, fitness and nutritional education online and in local parks around Australia with the help of local governments and corporations.

Flemming is married to Ian Purchas and has twin boys, Jimmy & Sammy.

References

External links

Jane Flemming at Australian Athletics Historical Results

"Coe scandal rocks London bid", The Age, 4 June 2004
'Is this Seb's new running mate?', Sunday Mirror - 8 December 2002
Mum in Profile: Jane Flemming

1965 births
Living people
Australian television presenters
Australian women television presenters
Australian female hurdlers
Australian heptathletes
Olympic athletes of Australia
Athletes (track and field) at the 1988 Summer Olympics
Athletes (track and field) at the 1992 Summer Olympics
Commonwealth Games gold medallists for Australia
Commonwealth Games silver medallists for Australia
Commonwealth Games medallists in athletics
Athletes (track and field) at the 1986 Commonwealth Games
Athletes (track and field) at the 1990 Commonwealth Games
Athletes (track and field) at the 1994 Commonwealth Games
World Athletics Championships athletes for Australia
Australian Institute of Sport track and field athletes
Doping cases in Australian track and field
Universiade medalists in athletics (track and field)
Universiade bronze medalists for Australia
Medalists at the 1989 Summer Universiade
Medallists at the 1986 Commonwealth Games
Medallists at the 1990 Commonwealth Games
Medallists at the 1994 Commonwealth Games